This is an incomplete list of the highest-funded crowdfunding projects (including projects which failed to achieve funding).

Over 50 million

10–50 million

5–10 million

1–5 million

See also 
 List of highest-funded equity crowdfunding projects
 Kickstarter#Top projects by funds raised
 Indiegogo#Top projects by funds raised
 List of video game crowdfunding projects

References

Highest funded crowdfunding projects
 
Highest-funded crowdfunding projects